Hiscock's Point was a small place with eight families near Burgeo.

See also
 List of communities in Newfoundland and Labrador

Populated coastal places in Canada
Populated places in Newfoundland and Labrador